The root-mouthed jellyfish (Eupilema inexpectata) is a species of cnidarian, a jellyfish in the small family Rhizostomatidae. It is the only member of the genus Eupilema.

Description
It has a smooth-surfaced bell with no tentacles. Its large manubrium (mouth) has many microscopic holes which extend directly into the gut.

Distribution
This jellyfish is found around the whole South African coast from the surface to at least  underwater.

Ecology
This is a large jellyfish which feeds on microscopic prey. It is often seen with small fish, which use its bulk to hide from predators.

References 

Rhizostomatidae
Animals described in 1992